Semmenstedt is a village and a former municipality in the district of Wolfenbüttel, in Lower Saxony, Germany. Since 1 November 2016, it is part of the municipality Remlingen-Semmenstedt.

References

Wolfenbüttel (district)
Former municipalities in Lower Saxony